The Takeover Tour (stylized as THE TAKEØVER TØUR) is the seventh concert tour by the American musical duo Twenty One Pilots, in support of their sixth studio album Scaled and Icy (2021). The tour began at the Bluebird Theater in Denver on September 21, 2021, and concluded at Wembley Arena in London on June 25, 2022.

Background and promotion 
On June 16, 2021, the band announced a residency-style, step-up tour, following the format of Tour De Columbus in the Emotional Roadshow World Tour, where they performed in small scale venues first, and then worked their way up to large scale venues. They announced stops in Denver, Los Angeles, Chicago, Boston, and Atlanta. Additionally, they announced two shows at Nationwide Arena in their hometown of Columbus, Ohio. Due to high demand, a third show was added. On July 23, 2021, the artists Half Alive, Arrested Youth and Jay Joseph were announced as openers for the U.S. leg of the tour. Mexico City was also announced, where they had performed at Corona Capital.

Set list
This set list is from the concert on October 30, 2021, in Columbus. It is not intended to represent all shows from the tour.

"Good Day"
"No Chances"
"Stressed Out"
"Migraine" / "Morph" / "Holding on to You"
"Heathens"
"The Outside"
"Message Man"
"Lane Boy"
"Chlorine"
"Mulberry Street"
"Bennie and the Jets" 
"Redecorate"
"Jumpsuit"
"Heavydirtysoul"
"Never Take It"
"Formidable" / "Doubt" / "Tear in My Heart" 
"I Can See Clearly Now" / "My Girl" / "Home" 
"House of Gold" / "We Don't Believe What's on TV"
"Saturday"
"Level of Concern"
"Ride"
"Car Radio"
Encore
 "Shy Away" / "I'm Not Okay (I Promise)"  
"Trees"

Tour dates

Notes

References 

2021 concert tours
2022 concert tours
Twenty One Pilots